The 2011 Elon Phoenix football team represented Elon University in the 2011 NCAA Division I FCS football season. The Phoenix were led by first-year head coach Jason Swepson and played their home games at Rhodes Stadium. They are a member of the Southern Conference. They finished the season 5–6, 3–5 in SoCon play to finish in a tie for sixth place.

Schedule

References

Elon
Elon Phoenix football seasons
Elon PHoenix football